R-L21 or R1b1a2a1a2c, also known as R-M529 or R-S145, is a Human Y-chromosome DNA haplogroup. It is often linked to the Celtic peoples, and their migrations into Western Europe, during the Bronze and Iron Ages.

One subclade, R-DF13 is numerically dominant amongst both bearers of R-L21 in general, and among living males in England, Ireland, Scotland, and Wales.

Current dispersion
Currently this haplogroup is mostly found among the inhabitants of Ireland and Great Britain, but is also found in Brittany, northern France, modern Northern Portugal, Galicia and Asturias in the northwest of Spain, and has some presence in Belgium and the Netherlands.

Archaeological testing
Three Early Bronze Age men (2026–1534 cal BC) from burials on Rathlin Island off the north coast of Ireland were all R1b1a2a1a2c, or R-L21. Rathlin2 was further defined as R1b1a2a1a2c1, or R-DF13/S521/CTS241. Rathlin1 was further defined as R1b1a2a1a2c1g, or R-DF21/S192.

References

External links 
R1b-M529

Genetic history of Europe
R1b-L21
Human population genetics
Indo-European genetics
History of the British Isles
Genetics in the United Kingdom
R